This is a list of film memorabilia.

Film memorabilia can include: autographs, collectibles, original concept art, costumes, lobby cards, magazines, posters, press kits, pressbooks, props, scripts, slides, still photos, and storyboards, as well as promotional material (e.g., t-shirts).

Props and equipment

Costumes

Other

See also
 List of individual dresses

References

Memorabilia
Film memorabilia